Gozitan dialects are rural dialects of Maltese spoken in the island of Gozo. The vowel shift of *ā (phonologically a) to o or u is their main differentiating trait.

Vocabulary 

Comparison of some words in Maltese and Gozitan dialects

See also 
 Gozo
 Nadur Carnival
 Languages of Malta

References

Further reading 
 Aquilina, Joseph, and B.S.J. Isserlin. 1981. A Survey of Contemporary Dialectal Maltese. Volume I: Gozo. Leeds: B.S.J. Isserlin.
 Farrugia, Ruben. 2021. ‘The Acoustic Vowel Space of Gozitan Naduri and Sannati Dialects’. In Semitic Dialects and Dialectology: Fieldwork—Community—Change, edited by Maciej Klimiuk, 197–211. Heidelberg: Heidelberg University Publishing.
 Gwida Il-Malti Kontra L-Għawdxi – Is-Sbuħija Tad-Djalett.
 Klimiuk, Maciej. 2021. ‘Language Questionnaire for Gozo, Malta’. Folia Orientalia 58: 111–89
 Klimiuk, Maciej. 2022. ‘Vowel Length in Maltese Dialects of Gozo’. In Semitic Dialects and Dialectology: Fieldwork—Community—Change, edited by Maciej Klimiuk, 213–27. Heidelberg: Heidelberg University Publishing.
 Klimiuk, Maciej, and Ruben Farrugia. 2022. ‘A Text in the Maltese Dialect of Sannat (Gozo) with Grammatical Remarks’. In Semitic Dialects and Dialectology: Fieldwork—Community—Change, edited by Maciej Klimiuk, 381–96. Heidelberg: Heidelberg University Publishing.
 Klimiuk, Maciej, and Maria Lipnicka. 2019. ‘Dialectology in Practice: Notes from Fieldwork in Gozo’. In Arabic Dialectology: Methodology and Field Research, edited by Werner Arnold and Maciej Klimiuk, 23–32. Wiesbaden: Harrassowitz.
 Klimiuk, Maciej, and Maria Lipnicka. 2022a. ‘Fishing and Cyclone Cutting: A Text from the Area of Għasri within the Dialect Continuum of Gozo (Malta)’. Mediterranean Language Review 29: 19–52.
 Klimiuk, Maciej, and Maria Lipnicka. 2022b. ‘The Gozitan Dialect of Xewkija: Three Recorded Dialogues and Some Preliminary Remarks’. The Israel Oriental Studies Annual 22: 145–77.
 Lipnicka, Maria. 2022. ‘Pausal Diphthongisation in Gozitan Dialects Compared to Zaḥlé, Lebanon’. In Semitic Dialects and Dialectology: Fieldwork—Community—Change, edited by Maciej Klimiuk, 229–41. Heidelberg: Heidelberg University Publishing.

Dialects of Maltese
Gozo